Jean-Paul Rabier (born 25 January 1955) is a French football manager and former player. He is currently the manager of Algerian Ligue Professionnelle 1 club MC Alger.

Career
Rabier played for Rennes, Valenciennes, Laval and Lens.

He coached Guingamp, La Roche VF, Rouen, Besançon, AS Vitré, Burkina Faso, MC Alger, Alkhor, F.C. Ryūkyū. He was appointed manager of the Madagascar national football team in April 2010.

References

External links

1955 births
Living people
People from Vendôme
Association football midfielders
French footballers
Stade Rennais F.C. players
Valenciennes FC players
Stade Lavallois players
RC Lens players
Ligue 1 players
French football managers
En Avant Guingamp managers
FC Rouen managers
Al-Khor SC managers
Racing Besançon managers
Expatriate football managers in Algeria
MC Alger managers
Expatriate football managers in Burkina Faso
Burkina Faso national football team managers
Expatriate football managers in Madagascar
Madagascar national football team managers
2004 African Cup of Nations managers
Sportspeople from Loir-et-Cher
Footballers from Centre-Val de Loire